Wang Luyao (born 18 March 1998) is a Chinese sports shooter. She competed in the women's 10 metre air rifle event at the 2020 Summer Olympics.

References

External links
 

1998 births
Living people
Chinese female sport shooters
Olympic shooters of China
Shooters at the 2020 Summer Olympics
Place of birth missing (living people)
Sportspeople from Wenzhou